Santa Rita, officially the Municipality of Santa Rita, is a 4th class municipality in the province of Pampanga, Philippines. According to the 2020 census, it has a population of 48,209 people. The town of Santa Rita belongs to the Second District of Pampanga, along with the towns in the south-western part of the province.

Santa Rita is popular for the turones de casoy delicacy, which is a cashew candy. It is chiefly a farming town.

History 
In 1697, the town started as a settlement at a place called Gasac, now Barangay San Isidro. Sta Rita was expanded to a wide territory which is now Barangays San Vicente, San Matias, Santa Monica, San Agustin and San Juan. Due to Hispanicization, Sta Rita was referred to as Santa Rita de Lele or neighboring Santa Rita and Santa Rita Baculud. In 1839, Rev. Fr. Francisco Rayo, the town’s parish priest, spearheaded the herculean task of building the present Parish Church located in now known as Barangay San Jose. In 1903, the town of Santa Rita registered a population of 7,954.

Geography
Santa Rita is located in the center of Pampanga province.

Barangays 
Santa Rita is politically subdivided into 10 barangays:

Becuran 
Dila Dila 
San Agustin
San Basilio 
San Isidro 
San Jose 
San Juan
San Matias
Santa Monica 
San Vicente

The largest barangays: Dila-dila and San Basilio occupy 52% of the total municipal land area. Barangays San Agustin and San Vicente with only a space of 2% and 2.13%, of the whole municipal land area are the smallest barangays.

Three barangays compose the poblacion of Santa Rita: barangays San Vicente, San Jose and part of San Matias. Barangay San Vicente serves as the minor Central Business District, It is where the Public Market is located, while Santa Rita Church and the Municipal Hall are located in San Jose. Mixed Old and new houses surround the area.

Climate

Demographics

Economy 

Santa Rita is a fourth class municipality in the province of Pampanga, Philippines.

Government

Like other towns in the Philippines, Santa Rita is governed by a mayor and vice mayor who are elected to three-year terms. The mayor is the executive head and leads the town's departments in executing the ordinances and improving public services. The vice mayor heads a legislative council (Sangguniang Bayan) consisting of councilors from the Barangays or Barrios.

The municipal government is divided into three branches: executive, legislative and judiciary. The judicial branch is administered solely by the Supreme Court of the Philippines. The LGUs have control of the executive and legislative branch.

The executive branch is composed of the mayor and the barangay captain for the barangays. The legislative branch is composed of the Sangguniang Bayan (town assembly), Sangguniang Barangay (barangay council), and the Sangguniang Kabataan for the youth sector.

The seat of Government is vested upon the Mayor and other elected officers who hold office at the Town hall. The Sanguniang Bayan is the center of legislation.

Elected officials

The Local Government Unit LGU of Santa Rita, Pampanga's Elected officials for the term of 2022-2025 are:
Mayor: Arthur "Art" Salalila
Vice mayor: Mercedita "Mercy" Bonaobra Carreon
Sangguniang Bayan Members
 Reynan Calo
 Athur "Jr" Salalila
 Kimberly "Kim" Cosme
 Rico Sta. Cruz
 Alvin Martin
 Alexander "Alex" Cruz
 Rogelio "Roy" Galang
 Renato "Nat" Gopez

Heritage, culture, landmarks and attractions

Dúman (Green Gold) festival & Santa Rita Delicacies 

Santa Rita is the home of Dúman and Ocampo-Lansang Delicacies (Turones de Casuy, Sansrival, Uraro and other sweets that sell in SM City Malls nationwide).

Dúman is made of malagkit rice (lacatan malútû) that is beaten from its husks and toasted in a clay oven. To the rest of the country, it may just be plain green rice or even un-popped pinipig. But it is a prized seasonal food that can be found during the Christmas season, after the rice harvest in November. The younger kernels of rice that don't fall off the husks are colored green. These husks are beaten against a hard surface until they fall off. They are then soaked in water, cooked for 30 minutes and then pounded. This rigorous process helps release the sweet oils and nuttiness of the rice.

Families who produce duman rice are called Mágdurúman. They pass their methods from generation to generation and have kept to the manual production process. Throughout Pampanga, street vendors selling green rice in bilaos or flat baskets are seen. These vendors often sell dúman near churches or marketplaces. It can be eaten plain and munched on like popcorn. It can also be snacked on in spoonfuls with sugar, or made into rice cakes. Kapampangans also like adding dúman to other dishes like fresh carabao's milk or hot chocolate as a breakfast cereal, or even ice cream.

Harvested and processed through the end of December, dúman is usually eaten with fresh carabao milk (gátas damúlag) for breakfast or stirred into sucláti (drinking chocolate made with Philippine cacao). In Santa Rita, a Pampangan municipality and the epicenter of dúman production, the eagerly awaited specialty is honored annually with its own festival.

Years ago, during dúman season, Santa Rita's streets rang daily with the “tok-tok” of baseball bat-sized wooden pestles hitting meter-high mortars as lacatan malútû, a red-husked variety of glutinous rice, was transformed into dúman. Nowadays, only a few barangays engage in the laborious and time-consuming production process.

The Dúman Festival started in 2002, which originated from the long-standing tradition of pounding and winnowing unripe glutinous rice (lacatan). The festival features alfresco dining in front of the Santa Rita Church patio were rows and rows of delicacy stalls would sell various pastries and native dishes of the town with duman being the major highlight. The food sold during the festival would include native pastry attractions of the town like sansrival, masa podrido, mamón and mamón tostado.

Dúman is relatively expensive. Food critic Claude Tayag explains that unlike the regular rice variety, which can be planted and harvested three times a year, dúman can only be harvested in the cool air of November and December, otherwise it will not be a bountiful one. For every hectare (San Agustín and Santa Mónica), a farmer can produce only a maximum of 4.5 cavans of duman, while a maximum of 300 cavans can be harvested from the regular rice variety. Dúman prices range from P600 to P1,000 per kilo depending on the quality.

Santa Rita de Casia Parish Church

The heritage Church is under the jurisdiction of the Roman Catholic Archdiocese of San Fernando.

Fr. Pedro de San Nicolas served as minister of both Porac and Santa Rita in 1722, but it was only in 1726 when Santa Rita had its own priest and therefore became an independent parish. Fr. Francisco Royo built the present church in 1839; Fr. Juan Merino completed it in 1868. These two priests also opened the road linking Santa Rita with Porac and Guagua. During the Revolution, the townspeople hid their last Augustianian parish priest, Fr. Celestino Garcia in their houses until the forces of Gen. Maximino Hizon captured him in Bacolor and took him all the way to Lepanto in the Cordilleras.

Building of the church had to be delayed until the late 19th century due to economic adjuristicial conditions. The single-nave church is 55m long, 13m wide and 10m high. It has a large and well lit transept. The solid brass facade has baroque characteristics and the single columns are relatively slender.

The reliquary

The parish is the site where the Holy Relic of Saint Rita de Cascia is enshrined. The parish first obtained the First Class Relic of the saint through the help and assistance of His Excellency, Most Rev. Riccardo Fontana of Spoleto-Norcia, Italy, the archdiocese to which Cascia belongs. Archbishop Fontana forwarded the Relic through the mediation of the Apostolic Nunciature in Manila to Archbishop Paciano Aniceto who in turn handed it over to the parish of Santa Rita de Cascia on August 17, 2008. The First Class Relic is from the flesh “ex carne”of the Saint. As noted in its accompanying Certificate of Authenticity, the relic was part of the last batch extracted from the incorrupt body of Saint Rita on 20 August 1972.

The reliquary is laid open for public veneration every August 17. St. Rita of Cascia (1381) was born in the Italian town of Roccaporena. When her husband and twin sons died, she entered the Augustinian Nuns. The next 40 years of her life saw St. Rita devoting herself to a life of prayer, and works and deeds of charity as dictated by the rules of St Augustine. At age 60, while meditating before the cross, a wound seeming afflicted by a thorn appeared on her forehead. St. Rita began boring the sign of stigmatization which is considered being one with Jesus. Because of the stigmata, she suffered in pain for the next 15 years which she courageously accepted. St. Rita died on May 22, 1457. Her intact and incorrupt body is kept and honored in the shrine at her hometown on Cascia, Italy.

See also
 Historic houses in Santa Rita, Pampanga

References

External links

 [ Philippine Standard Geographic Code]
Philippine Census Information
Local Governance Performance Management System

Municipalities of Pampanga